James Ward (26 July 1929 – October 1985) was a Scottish amateur football centre forward who played in the Scottish League for Queen's Park and St Johnstone. He also played in the Football League for Crewe Alexandra and was capped by Scotland at amateur level.

References

Scottish footballers
Scottish Football League players
Queen's Park F.C. players
Association football forwards
1929 births
Footballers from Glasgow
Crewe Alexandra F.C. players
English Football League players
St Johnstone F.C. players
Hounslow F.C. players
1985 deaths
Scotland amateur international footballers